David Corrêa da Fonseca (born 17 October 1995), simply known as David, is a Brazilian footballer who plays as a winger for São Paulo, on loan from Internacional.

Career statistics

Honours
Vitória
Campeonato Baiano: 2016, 2017

Cruzeiro
Campeonato Mineiro: 2018, 2019
Copa do Brasil: 2018

Fortaleza
Campeonato Cearense: 2020, 2021

References

External links

1995 births
Living people
Sportspeople from Espírito Santo
Brazilian footballers
Association football forwards
Campeonato Brasileiro Série A players
Campeonato Brasileiro Série B players
Esporte Clube Vitória players
Cruzeiro Esporte Clube players
Fortaleza Esporte Clube players
Sport Club Internacional players